Elections to Glasgow City Council were held on 6 April 1995, the same day as the other Scottish local government elections. The election was the first for the Glasgow City Council; a unitary authority which had been created by the Local Government etc. (Scotland) Act 1994 out of parts of the former City of Glasgow District Council (a subsidiary of the wider Strathclyde region for the previous 20 years); wards in Rutherglen and Cambuslang transferred from Glasgow to the new South Lanarkshire area.

Election results

Ward results

References

1995 Scottish local elections
1995